Wu Changqi (born 30 June 1993) is a Chinese footballer.

Career
Born in Shanghai, Wu moved to hometown club Shanghai Shenhua in 2014, having spent time with Tianjin Huochetou. After a series of loan moves, including two in Spain, and one in the China League Two with Shanghai Sunfun, Wu was ostracized from the Shanghai Shenhua squad, going three seasons without an appearance for the Chinese Super League club. He was released at the end of the 2020 season, at the expiration of his contract.

Career statistics

Club
.

Notes

References

1993 births
Living people
Footballers from Shanghai
Chinese footballers
Association football forwards
China League Two players
Shanghai Shenhua F.C. players
La Roda CF players
Shanghai Sunfun F.C. players
Chinese expatriate footballers
Chinese expatriate sportspeople in Spain
Expatriate footballers in Spain